Mowlana Zayn al-Dīn Abūbakr Tāybādi (in Persian: مولانا زین الدین ابوبکر تایبادی) (died 1389) was an Iranian mystic and Sufi. His tombstone was built on an order by Ghiyath al-Din Pir Ahmad Khvafi who was at the time Shahrukh Mirza's vizier.

References 

Iranian Sufis
14th-century Iranian people